In computer science, streaming algorithms are algorithms for processing data streams in which the input is presented as a sequence of items and can be examined in only a few passes, typically just one.  These algorithms are designed to operate with limited memory, generally logarithmic in the size of the stream and/or in the maximum value in the stream, and may also have limited processing time per item.

As a result of these constraints, streaming algorithms often produce approximate answers based on a summary or "sketch" of the data stream.

History

Though streaming algorithms had already been studied by Munro and Paterson as early as 1978, as well as Philippe Flajolet and G. Nigel Martin in 1982/83, the field of streaming algorithms was first formalized and popularized in a 1996 paper by Noga Alon, Yossi Matias, and Mario Szegedy. For this paper, the authors later won the Gödel Prize in 2005 "for their foundational contribution to streaming algorithms." There has since been a large body of work centered around data streaming algorithms that spans a diverse spectrum of computer science fields such as theory, databases, networking, and natural language processing.

Semi-streaming algorithms were introduced in 2005 as a relaxation of streaming algorithms for graphs, in which the space allowed is linear in the number of vertices , but only logarithmic in the number of edges .  This relaxation is still meaningful for dense graphs, and can solve interesting problems (such as connectivity) that are insoluble in  space.

Models

Data stream model 
In the data stream model, some or all of the input is represented as a finite sequence of integers (from some finite domain) which is generally not available for random access, but instead arrives one at a time in a "stream". They can generally make only some small constant number of passes over the stream, sometimes just one.

Turnstile and cash register models 

Much of the streaming literature is concerned with computing statistics on
frequency distributions that are too large to be stored. For this class of
problems, there is a vector 
(initialized to the zero vector ) that has updates
presented to it in a stream. The goal of these algorithms is to compute
functions of  using considerably less space than it
would take to represent  precisely. There are two
common models for updating such streams, called the "cash register" and
"turnstile" models.<ref
name="turnstile"></ref>

In the cash register model, each update is of the form , so that  is incremented by some positive
integer . A notable special case is when 
(only unit insertions are permitted).

In the turnstile model, each update is of the form , so that  is incremented by some (possibly negative) integer . In the "strict turnstile" model, no
 at any time may be less than zero.

Sliding window model 

Several papers also consider the "sliding window" model. In this model,
the function of interest is computing over a fixed-size window in the
stream. As the stream progresses, items from the end of the window are
removed from consideration while new items from the stream take their
place.

Besides the above frequency-based problems, some other types of problems
have also been studied. Many graph problems are solved in the setting
where the adjacency matrix or the adjacency list of the graph is streamed in
some unknown order. There are also some problems that are very dependent
on the order of the stream (i.e., asymmetric functions), such as counting
the number of inversions in a stream and finding the longest increasing
subsequence.

Evaluation 

The performance of an algorithm that operates on data streams is measured by three basic factors:
 The number of passes the algorithm must make over the stream.
 The available memory.
 The running time of the algorithm.
These algorithms have many similarities with online algorithms since they both require decisions to be made before all data are available, but they are not identical. Data stream algorithms only have limited memory available but they may be able to defer action until a group of points arrive, while online algorithms are required to take action as soon as each point arrives.

If the algorithm is an approximation algorithm then the accuracy of the answer is another key factor.

Applications

Streaming algorithms have several applications in networking such as
monitoring network links for elephant flows, counting the number of
distinct flows, estimating the distribution of flow sizes, and so
on. They also have applications in
databases, such as estimating the size of a join .

Some streaming problems

Frequency moments

The first moment  is simply the sum of the frequencies (i.e., the total count). The second moment  is useful for computing statistical properties of the data, such as the Gini coefficient
of variation.  is defined as the frequency of the most frequent items.

The seminal paper of Alon, Matias, and Szegedy dealt with the problem of estimating the frequency moments.

Calculating frequency moments 
A direct approach to find the frequency moments requires to maintain a register  for all distinct elements  which requires at least memory
of order . But we have space limitations and require an algorithm that computes in much lower memory. This can be achieved by using approximations instead of exact values.
Where ε is the approximation parameter and δ is the confidence parameter.

Calculating  F0 (distinct elements in a DataStream)

FM-Sketch algorithm 
Flajolet et al. in  introduced probabilistic method of counting which was inspired from a paper by Robert Morris. Morris in his paper says that if the requirement of accuracy is dropped, a counter n can be replaced by a counter  which can be stored in  bits. Flajolet et al. in  improved this method by using a hash function  which is assumed to uniformly distribute the element in the hash space (a binary string of length ).

Let  represent the kth bit in binary representation of 

Let  represents the position of least

Let A be the sequence of data stream of length M whose cardinality need to be determined. Let BITMAP [0...L − 1] be the
hash space where the (hashedvalues) are recorded. The below algorithm then determines approximate cardinality of A.Procedure FM-Sketch:

    for i in 0 to L − 1 do
        BITMAP[i] := 0 
    end for
    for x in A: do
        Index := ρ(hash(x))
        if BITMAP[index] = 0 then
            BITMAP[index] := 1
        end if
    end for
    B := Position of left most 0 bit of BITMAP[] 
    return 2 ^ BIf there are N distinct elements in a data stream.
 For  then BITMAP[i] is certainly 0
 For  then BITMAP[i] is certainly 1
 For  then BITMAP[i] is a fringes of 0's and 1's

K-minimum value algorithm 
The previous algorithm describes the first attempt to approximate F0 in the data stream by Flajolet and Martin. Their algorithm picks a random hash function which they assume to uniformly distribute the hash values in hash space.

Bar-Yossef et al. in  introduced k-minimum value algorithm for determining number of distinct elements in data stream. But they fixed a limit t to number of values in hash space. The value of t is assumed of the order  (i.e. less approximation-value ε requires more t). KMV algorithm keeps only t-smallest hash values in the hash space. After all the m values of stream have arrived,  is used to calculate. That is, in a close-to uniform hash space, they expect at-least t elements to be less than  .Procedure 2 K-Minimum Value

Initialize first t values of KMV 
for a in a1 to an do
    if h(a) < Max(KMV) then
        Remove Max(KMV) from KMV set
        Insert h(a) to KMV 
    end if
end for 
return t/Max(KMV)

Complexity analysis of KMV 
KMV algorithm can be implemented in  memory bits space. Each hash value requires space of order  memory bits. There are hash values of the order . The access time can be reduced if we store the t hash values in a binary tree.

Calculating  
Alon et al. estimates  by defining random variables that can be computed within given space and time.

Assume length of sequence m is known in advance. Then construct a random variable X as follows:
 Let , represents the number of occurrences of  within the members of the sequence  following .
 Random variable .

Assume S1 be of the order  and S2 be of the order . Algorithm takes S2 random variable  and outputs the median  . Where  is the average of  where 1 ≤ j ≤ S1.

Now calculate expectation of random variable .

Complexity of  
So, to compute  we need to maintain only  bits for storing  and  bits for storing .

Hence the total space complexity the algorithm takes is of the order of

Simpler approach to calculate  
The previous algorithm calculates  in order of  memory bits.

This further reduces the complexity to calculate   to

Frequent elements

In the data stream model, the frequent elements problem is to output a set of elements that constitute more than some fixed fraction of the stream. A special case is the majority problem, which is to determine whether or not any value constitutes a majority of the stream.

More formally, fix some positive constant  > 1, let the length of the stream be , and let  denote the frequency of value  in the stream. The frequent elements problem is to output the set {  |  > m/c }.

Some notable algorithms are:
 Boyer–Moore majority vote algorithm
 Count-Min sketch
 Lossy counting
 Multi-stage Bloom filters
 Misra–Gries heavy hitters algorithm
 Misra–Gries summary

Event detection
Detecting events in data streams is often done using a heavy hitters algorithm as listed above: the most frequent items and their frequency are determined using one of these algorithms, then the largest increase over the previous time point is reported as trend. This approach can be refined by using exponentially weighted moving averages and variance for normalization.

Counting distinct elements

Counting the number of distinct elements in a stream (sometimes called the
 moment) is another problem that has been well studied.
The first algorithm for it was proposed by Flajolet and Martin. In 2010, Daniel Kane, Jelani Nelson and David Woodruff found an asymptotically optimal algorithm for this problem. It uses  space, with  worst-case update and reporting times, as well as universal hash functions and a -wise independent hash family where .

Entropy

The (empirical) entropy of a set of frequencies  is

Online learning

Learn a model (e.g. a classifier) by a single pass over a training set.

 Feature hashing
 Stochastic gradient descent

Lower bounds

Lower bounds have been computed for many of the data streaming problems
that have been studied. By far, the most common technique for computing
these lower bounds has been using communication complexity.

See also 
 Data stream mining
 Data stream clustering
 Online algorithm
 Stream processing
 Sequential algorithm

Notes

References
 .
 .
 .
 .
 .
 .
 .
 Heath, D., Kasif, S., Kosaraju, R., Salzberg, S.,  Sullivan, G., "Learning Nested Concepts With Limited Storage",  Proceeding IJCAI'91 Proceedings of the 12th international joint conference on Artificial intelligence - Volume 2, Pages 777-782,  Morgan Kaufmann Publishers Inc. San Francisco, CA, USA ©1991
 .

Streaming algorithms